"Slow Train" is a song by British duo Flanders and Swann, written in July 1963. It laments the closure of railway stations and lines brought about by the Beeching cuts in the 1960s, and also the passing of a way of life.

Lyrics

"Slow Train" takes the form of an elegiac list song of railway stations, which has been likened to a litany. Its evocation of quiet, rural stations is highly romanticised and uses imagery such as the presence of a station cat or milk churns on a platform to express a "less hurried way of life" that is about to vanish:

The strength of "Slow Train" is considered to lie in its list of "achingly bucolic" names of rural halts. The nostalgically poetic tone of Flanders's lyrics has been likened to Edward Thomas's 1914 poem "Adlestrop", which wistfully evokes a fleeting scene of Adlestrop railway station in Gloucestershire.

Although most of the stations mentioned in Flanders's song were earmarked for closure under the Beeching cuts, a number of the stations were ultimately spared closure: Chester-le-Street, Formby, Ambergate, and Arram all remain open, and Gorton and Openshaw also survives, now called Gorton. Some stations referred to in the song have since been re-opened, notably Chorlton-cum-Hardy. It had closed in January 1967, but re-opened in July 2011 as Chorlton tram stop.

Selby and Goole were not threatened by Beeching, though the line ("from Selby to Goole") mentioned in the song was closed to passengers. The other line mentioned, "from St Erth to St Ives" in Cornwall stayed open.  

Michael Flanders' song treats Formby Four Crosses and Armley Moor Arram as station names, but in both cases he combined two consecutive names from an alphabetical list of stations. Leon Berger, archivist of the estate of Donald Swann, said that Flanders had taken his list from one published in The Guardian, which was the source of some of the discrepancies between the names in the songs and the historic names of the stations.

Other versions
In 2004, Canadian classical quartet Quartetto Gelato released a themed album called Quartetto Gelato Travels the Orient Express, celebrating the original journey of Orient Express and featuring music from London to Istanbul. The album begins with a rendition of "Slow Train", with the final lines changed to reflect the route of the Orient Express.

A version of "The Slow Train" by the King's Singers is on electronica duo Lemon Jelly's track "'76 aka The Slow Train", combined with a cover of the Albert Hammond song "I'm a Train" also performed by the King's Singers. A live version by Stackridge was included in its 2009 DVD 4x4.

Michael Williams' book On the Slow Train takes its name from the song. It celebrates twelve of the most beautiful and historic journeys in Britain that were saved from the Beeching cuts, including famous routes such as the Settle–Carlisle line and less well-known pleasures, such as the four-hour Preston–Carlisle route along the remote Cumbrian coastline.

English folk singer-songwriter Frank Turner included a version of the song on his 2011 compilation album The Second Three Years.

List of stations referred to in the lyrics
Where appropriate, the correct name of the station is shown in brackets.

 Ten of the 31 stations were open in 2012, with five others on lines still open.
 Trouble House Halt opened in 1959, shortly before Beeching became BR chairman. 
 Re-opening of the line through Cheslyn Hay in 1989 included a new Landywood station, half a mile to the south.
 Kirby Muxloe is regularly proposed for re-opening with the freight-only Ivanhoe line remaining between Leicester and Burton; however, a scheme re-appraisal by Scott Wilson in 2009 suggested there was little likelihood of the line reopening to passengers.
 Littleton and Badsey, Chittening Platform and Armley Moor are on lines still open. Chittening and Armley are in the Bristol and Leeds urban areas, and are proposed for re-opening.

See also
 Abandoned railway station
 List of closed railway stations in Britain

Notes

References

Bibliography

External links

 Lyrics of "Slow Train"
 Flanders and Swann website
 Disused railway stations

Flanders and Swann songs
Slow Train
Slow Train
List songs
1963 songs
Songs about trains
Songs about nostalgia